Quail Creek may refer to:

 Quail Creek (Alaska), a tributary of Troublesome Creek
 Quail Creek State Park, a state park in Utah